The Joan Donaldson Newsworld Scholarship is awarded annually by CBC News Network to aspiring journalists in honour of Newsworld's former head, Joan Donaldson.  As many as eight recipients are chosen from journalism programs from across Canada.  It is considered one of the highest awards in Canadian student journalism.  Many recipients continue to work for CBC Newsworld as reporters or behind the scenes.

There has been controversy that the selection process places too much emphasis on gender and racial diversity, which is a common criticism of CBC in general.  This was brought to a head in 2005 when senior management voiced their concerns internally over that year's group, calling it a "failure" and saying that it was not adequately representative of Canadian society.  That year seven out of the eight recipients were female and no visible minorities were represented.  This resulted in a greater attention to diversity in the 2006 selection, with that year's group being thought of as ideally balanced.

Donaldson Scholars

2013

Julia Whalen (St. Thomas University)
Trinh Theresa Do (Ryerson University), CBC Reporter in Ottawa
Lindsay Sample (University of British Columbia), Associate Producer with Marketplace
Kate McKenna (University of King's College), CBC Reporter in Iqaluit 
Lucas Powers (University of British Columbia)
Asha Siad (Mount Royal) 
Asher Greenberg (Ryerson University)
Roxanna Woloshyn (University of Regina)
Idil Mussa (University of Western Ontario)
James Schofield (CBC News Weather Scholar)

2012

Alina Perrault (Western Academy of Broadcasting)
Brigitte Noël (Ryerson University), CBC Reporter in Fredericton
Calvin To (Ryerson University), reporter, CTV Toronto
Christy Climenhaga (CBC News Weather Scholar), CBC Saskatchewan meteorologist and anchor 
David Thurton (Ryerson University), CBC Reporter in Halifax
Emily Brass (Concordia University), CBC Reporter in Montreal 
Julia Sisler (Carleton University)
Lisa Laventure (University of Western Ontario), associate producer with The National
Matthew Black (University of British Columbia), CBC Reporter/Producer in Vancouver

2011

Adam Avrashi
Najat Abdalhadi
Giselle Dookhie
Sol Israel
Alana Bergstrom
Lily Boisson
Fabiola Carletti
Sachin Seth (Ryerson University)

2010

Josh Bloch (Ryerson University)
Alexandra Hunnings (Ryerson University)
Karen Jouhal (University of King's College)
Kevin Sauvé (University of British Columbia)
Vanmala Subramaniam (Concordia University)
Meg Wilcox (Carleton University)
Karin Yeske (University of Regina)

2009

Stephanie VanKampen (St. Thomas University)
Tashauna Reid (Ryerson University)
Saphia Khamabalia (Ryerson University)
Redmond Shannon (Concordia University)
Krysia Collyer (University of British Columbia)
Anna Fong  (University of British Columbia)
Chris Glover (Ryerson University)

2008

Danielle Mario 
Michael Bobbie 
Jeff Semple
Beza Seife 
Kenyon Wallace (Carleton University)
Angela Gilbert (St. Thomas University)
Ashifa Kassam

2007

Kennedy Jawoko (Ryerson University)
Neala Barton (Carleton University) 
Lucas Chambers (University of King's College)
Steve Bruce (St. Thomas University) 
Abby Schneider (Carleton University)
Genevieve Tomney (Ryerson University)
Manusha Janakiram (Concordia University)

2006

Jayson Go (University of British Columbia) Reporter for Breakfast Television at Citytv Edmonton
Rafi Mustafa (Ryerson University) CBC Newsworld producer
Jennifer Choi (University of King's College) CBC New Brunswick reporter
Miranda Mathews (St. Thomas University) CBC Newsworld
Megan Thomas (Carleton University), Associate Producer for CBC Radio in Sudbury, Ontario
Peter Cowan (Ryerson University), Radio Reporter for CBC News in Happy Valley-Goose Bay, Newfoundland and Labrador
Emilie White (Concordia University)
Tanya Beja (Carleton University), Reporter for Global BC

2005

Sarah Everts (Carleton University)
Hilary Walker (Ryerson University)
Roger Samson (Carleton University)
Caroline Locher (Concordia University)
Catherine Cullen (Concordia University)
Willow Smith (Ryerson University)
Jennifer Anderson (University of Western Ontario)
Bethany Lindsay (University of British Columbia)

2004

Deana Sumanac (Ryerson University)
Sarah Quadri (Ryerson University)
Lyla Miller (Carleton University), radio reporter for CBC News in Sudbury, ON
Kathleen Renne (University of King's College)
Samira Hussain (University of Western Ontario)
William Mbaho (University of British Columbia)
Paul McGrath (Concordia University), producer for The Hour
Silas Polkinghorne (University of Regina)

2003
Derron Bodell (Concordia University)
Angela Chang (The University of King's College), newsreader CBC Radio Fredericton
Jeremy Keehn (University of British Columbia), senior editor at The Walrus
Raelyne Linton (University of Regina) currently studying nursing
Nicola Luksic (Carleton University)
Rick Matthews (Ryerson University), producer for The Hour
Zulekha Nathoo (University of Western Ontario), working in Zambia
Corey Snook (University of Western Ontario)

2002
Kirsten Anderson (University of Regina)
Sara Brunetti (Carleton University)
Katie Eggins (Concordia University)
Jennifer Haynes (University of Western Ontario)
Karen Kawawada (University of British Columbia), reporter for The Kitchener-Waterloo Record
Liam Mitchell (University of British Columbia), Senior Communications Strategist, University of Toronto
Kelly Patrick (Carleton University)
Heather Robinson (University of Western Ontario), reporter for CBC TV Victoria

2001
Caroline Plante (Concordia University), reporter for Global Quebec in Quebec City, Quebec
Joan Ireland (Saskatchewan Indian Federated College)
Colleen Ross (University of Western Ontario)
Jennifer Chen (University of British Columbia), associate producer for CBC Radio's The Early Edition in Vancouver, British Columbia
Lyndsay Duncombe (Ryerson University), reporter for CBC News at Six in Winnipeg, Manitoba
Erin Boudreau (University of King’s College), producer for CBC TV London UK
Julie Grenier (Carleton University)
Andrea Sellinger (University of Regina)

2000
Peter Wall (University of British Columbia), video journalist for CBC's The National
Chris Epp (Ryerson University)
Kristen Higgins (University of Regina)
Danielle Stone (University of King's College)
Danielle Brown (Concordia University)
Carissa Almeida (University of Western Ontario)
Connie Walker (Saskatchewan Indian Federated College), former host of Street Cents on CBC
Jennifer Brown (Carleton University)

1999
James MacDonald (University of Western Ontario)
Daniel Kitts (Carleton University), producer with TVO's The Agenda with Steve Paikin
Signe Katz (Concordia University)
Farha Akhtar (University of Regina)
Michelle Hugli (Saskatchewan Indian Federated College)
Ian Clayton (University of British Columbia)
Angela Naus (Ryerson University)
Robert Sawatzky (University of King's College)

External links 
Donaldson Scholarship 
http://www.cbc.ca/joandonaldsonscholars/aboutschol.html
CBC Newsworld: Joan Donaldson Scholarship
CBC/Radio-Canada News Release (January 24, 2003)

Canadian Broadcasting Corporation
Scholarships in Canada